Ayesha Rascoe (born June 10, 1986) is an American journalist named host of Weekend Edition Sunday in February 2022. She previously served as the White House reporter for NPR. Rascoe covered the Obama White House for Reuters before moving to NPR in 2017. Her stories are regularly broadcast on the NPR shows Morning Edition and All Things Considered, and she appears regularly on NPR's Politics Podcast.

Rascoe began her reporting career at Reuters where she covered environment policy, including the Deepwater Horizon oil spill and the response to the Fukushima Daiichi nuclear disaster in 2011. She has appeared on Washington Week, Meet The Press, CNN and MSNBC. She married Patrick Trice, a U.S. veteran, in 2012. Rascoe received a B.A. in journalism from Howard University where she was editor in chief of the student newspaper The Hilltop.

References

21st-century American journalists
NPR personalities
1986 births
Living people
African-American journalists
American political journalists
Howard University alumni
American women radio journalists
Reuters people
21st-century African-American people
20th-century African-American people
20th-century African-American women
21st-century African-American women